Sexual frustration is a sense of dissatisfaction stemming from a discrepancy between a person's desired and achieved sexual activity. It may result from physical, mental, emotional, social, financial, and religious or spiritual barriers. It may also derive from not being satisfied during sex, which may be due to issues such as anorgasmia, anaphrodisia, premature ejaculation, delayed ejaculation, erectile dysfunction, or an incompatibility or discrepancy (or self-sensed feeling of discrepancy) in libido. It may also relate to broader existential frustration.

Sexual frustration can result from an individual's lacking one or more of the organs needed for achieving sexual release. This may occur when a male is born without a penis or has it removed, or when a female's clitoris is removed for cultural or medical reasons.

Historical methods of dealing with sexual frustration have included fasting and the taking of libido suppressants such as anaphrodisiacs (food supplements) or antaphrodisiacs (medicinal supplements). Sexual frustration can be pertinent despite an individual being sexually active, as may be the case for example with sexually active hypersexual people. Sexual frustration has been shown to be a natural stage of the development throughout youth, when going through puberty as a teenager.

See also
Edging (sexual practice)
Erotic sexual denial
Orgastic potency
Sexual abstinence
Sexual tension
Incel

References

Interpersonal conflict
Human sexuality